The Wounded Surgeon: Confession and Transformation in Six American Poets is a book by Adam Kirsch, published in 2005 by W. W. Norton & Company.  The book considers in turn the work of six poets whose work has often been labelled 'confessional': Robert Lowell, Elizabeth Bishop, John Berryman, Randall Jarrell, Delmore Schwartz and Sylvia Plath. Kirsch has set out to write "a brief biography of their poetry", and attempts to demonstrate that the metaphor of confession has led to a misunderstanding of their work, in particular by doing a disservice to the technique and craft that the writers brought to bear to fashion works of art.

Footnotes
In the following footnotes, the subject of this article has been abbreviated to TWS.

2005 non-fiction books
Books of literary criticism
Books about poetry
W. W. Norton & Company books